The village and parish of Doddington are on the east side of the Milfield Plain, nearly 3 miles north of the town of Wooler, in the county of Northumberland, England. Notable buildings in Doddington include Doddington Hall and the Anglican church of St Mary and St Michael, which was built in the 18th century on the site of an original 12th-century place of worship. Wooler Golf Course is also near Doddington.

History and cultural significance 
In 1734, the village was described in George Mark's Survey of a Portion of Northumberland as "remarkable for its largeness, the badness of its houses and low situation, and perhaps for the greatest quantities of geese of any in its neighbourhood". At about the same time, the tune Dorrington, also known as Dorrington Lads, was written down in the William Dixon manuscript. Having 14 strains, it is the most complex and elaborate of the pieces in that early source for Northumbrian music. The last tune played, on his deathbed, by the celebrated piper Will Allan, who died near Rothbury in 1779, was Dorrington Lads. A rhyme has survived, which fits the second strain of this tune:
 Dorrington lads is bonny and Dorrington lads is canny
 And I'll hae a Dorrington lad, and ride a Dorrington cuddy.
The tune survives in several versions besides that in the William Dixon manuscript; a five-strain version is found both in the Rook manuscript from near Carlisle, and in the Fenwick manuscript, where it is attributed to Robert Reid and ultimately to James Allan and his father Will. This version has much material that also appears in the Dixon version; two rather different versions adapted for Northumbrian smallpipes are found in the Robert Bewick manuscript, and the Lionel Winship manuscript; a further version is found in the manuscript collection of Tom Clough, starting with a variant of Dixon's second strain.

In The Denham Tracts, compiled in the mid-19th century, another rhyme about the streets of the village is found:
 Southgate and Sandgate and up the Cat Raw,
 The Tinkler's Street, and Byegate Ha'!
The Tinkler's Street was where itinerant hawkers sold their wares. This association with travellers is not surprising, as Doddington is quite close to Kirk Yetholm, the main base of the Border Gypsies.

Demography 
The 2001 UK Census shows a population of 146, with a 50:50 male:female split.

Economy 
Besides farming, there was formerly a sandstone quarry in the area, and coal mines. A well-known business currently in Doddington is the Doddington Dairy farm, a producer of organic cheeses and ice creams.

References

External links

GENUKI (Accessed: 10 November 2008) 	
Northumberland Communities (Accessed: 10 November 2008)

Villages in Northumberland